The Invitation Tour was the third headlining concert tour by American boy band Why Don't We, in support of their fourth extended play, Invitation (2017). The tour began in Cincinnati on February 27, 2018, and concluded in Sydney on August 31, 2018.

Background and development 
Following the release of Invitation, Why Don't We announced they would embark on their third headlining concert tour, following the Taking You Tour (2017)  and the Something Different Tour (2018). Originally, the tour consisted of 33 shows, all in North America. European, Australian, and Asian dates were announced in the following months.

EBEN was announced as the opening act.

Setlist 
This setlist is representative of the show on February 27, 2018, in Cincinnati. It does not represent all the shows from the tour.

"Air of the Night"
"On My Way"
"Tell Me"
"Just to See You Smile"
"Free"
"Shape of You" / "M.I.A"
"Gucci Gang"
"We The Party"
"All My Love"
"Why Don't We Just"
"Invitation"
"Nobody Gotta Know"
"Made For"
"Words I Didn't Say"
"Never Know"
"Boomerang"
"Something Different"
"Taking You"
"These Girls"

"Talk"
"Trust Fund Baby"

Tour dates

References

2018 concert tours